The Cenobites LP is the eponymous debut album by the American hip hop duo the Cenobites, composed of rapper Kool Keith and producer Godfather Don. It was first released as an EP in 1995 via Fondle 'Em Records and was later expanded for LP in 1997 and CD in 2000. Percee P and Bobbito Garcia made guest appearances on the record.

History
In 1992, South Bronx innovators Ultramagnetic MC's recruited little known MC/producer Godfather Don to assist them on their third LP, The Four Horsemen. The dark, jazzy sound he contributed was something of a departure for the group, which was known for its futuristic funk. During and after the album's recording, additional material featuring Kool Keith and Godfather Don was created for the Cenobites side project.

Radio personality Bobbito Garcia aka DJ Cucumberslice, a longtime fan and supporter of Ultramagnetic, dropped the Cenubites EP in 1995 on his own Fondle 'Em label. He also made his rapping debut as a featured performer on two of the disc's eight tracks. Another South Bronx veteran, Percee P, also contributed a guest appearance. All the artists involved with the project were regulars on WKCR's Stretch Armstrong radio show in the early '90s, of which Bobbito was co-host.

Rumour has it that this album was recorded in a week, during a period where Kool Keith & Godfather Don locked themselves away from the outside world (in a basement), only adding additional vocals after they emerged from their retreat. This would be in keeping with the name of the group "Cenobite", as Cenobites are monks who would often shun the outside world in favor of a hermit type of life.

Release
Originally released as a seven-track extended play in 1995, it was reissued as nine-track longplay record with two more tracks added into it and retitled the Cenobites LP. A CD version was finally issued in 2000 with another bonus track, an extended version of Ultramagnetic MCs' "Checkin' My Style" renamed "Return To Zero", which boasted a previously omitted Godather Don verse.

A handful of the Cenobites tracks remain officially unreleased including: "You Lose," "Lazy Woman," "Cold Peein' On 'Em," "Break 'Em Down" and "We Can Do This (ft. Mike L & TR Love)". In addition, Kool Keith and Godfather Don appeared together on Raw Breed's "Rampage/Outta Control" with the legendary Melle Mel, and reunited in 1998 for Godfather Don's "Voices".

Track listing

Personnel
Rodney Chapman – main artist, producer, vocals
Keith Matthew Thornton – main artist, vocals
Bobbito Garcia – featured artist, executive producer
John Percy Simon – featured artist
Christopher Scott – mastering

Release history

External links

References

1994 debut albums
Kool Keith albums
Godfather Don albums
Albums produced by Godfather Don
Albums recorded at WKCR-FM